A racchabanda (or raccha banda) is a raised platform typically built under the shade of a huge tree, common in Andhra Pradesh.  The tree may be Ficus benghalensis or Sacred fig or Jambul or Tamarind. The platforms may be built with sedimentary rocks or bricks or cement. Historically Racchabandas came into existence in India before the Medieval period. Rachabandas can also be found in several rural villages throughout India.

Importance 
Racchabanda is a traditional get together place for the villagers to discuss their social problems, economic issues, and other disputes. Head of a village who is called munsabu (mostly elder males) sits on racchabanda to give solutions for several problems and settle various disputes among villagers. Racchabandas act as local courts which are always confined to the limits of their respective villages.

Modern status 
In modern times, racchabandas are becoming extinct due to urbanization.

References 

Culture of Andhra Pradesh
Culture of Telangana
Indian furniture